Agostino Morosini was a Roman Catholic prelate who served as Titular Archbishop of Damascus (1621–1632?).

Biography
On 17 May 1621, Agostino Morosini was appointed during the papacy of Pope Gregory XV as Titular Archbishop of Damascus.
On 1 June 1621, he was consecrated bishop by Ulpiano Volpi, Bishop of Novara, with Attilio Amalteo, Titular Archbishop of Athenae, and Cosimo de Torres, Titular Archbishop of Hadrianopolis in Haemimonto, serving as co-consecrators. 
It is uncertain how long he served as Titular Archbishop of Damascus. The next bishop of record is Antonio Sotomayor who was appointed on 16 July 1632.

Episcopal succession

References 

17th-century Roman Catholic titular bishops
Bishops appointed by Pope Gregory XV